The Barbados women's national field hockey team represents Barbados in women's international field hockey competitions.

Tournament history

Pan American Games
1987 – 5th place
1991 – 8th place
2011 – 8th place

Pan American Cup
 2004 – 6th place
 2017 – Withdrew

Commonwealth Games
 2006 - 9th place

Central American and Caribbean Games
 1986 – 
 1993 – 4th place
 1998 – 4th place
 2002 – 
 2006 – 
 2010 – 
 2014 – 5th place
 2018 – 4th place
 2023 – Qualified

Pan American Challenge
 2015 –

See also
Barbados men's national field hockey team

References

External links
Official website Barbados Hockey Federation

Americas women's national field hockey teams
field hockey women
Women's field hockey in Barbados